John A. Garcia (born 1949) is a Spanish-born American entrepreneur and philanthropist best known as a pioneer of the modern American video game industry. His early contributions to gaming were partially responsible for the industry's recovery from the video game crash of 1983.

Personal life 

Born in Galicia, Spain, Garcia's family immigrated to the United States when he was a child. He is the brother of oncologist Dr. Francisco Garcia-Moreno and the father of two.

After graduating from DePaul University, Garcia went on to study film at the London Film School.

In the early 1980s, realizing the potential behind the nascent video game industry, he gave up his work in film to dedicate himself to his then hobby, computer programming. He went on to become a leader of the video game industry, introducing innovations that define the modern gaming experience.

He founded NovaLogic, Inc. in 1985 and was the CEO until its acquisition by THQ Nordic in October 2016.

Career

Early years 

Garcia co-founded one of the first commercial film production companies in the United Arab Emirates. In the late 1970s, predicting a boom in the personal computer market, he moved to Southern California, where he worked as Vice President at Datasoft, and was responsible for production of at least 40 software titles.

After the video game crash of 1983, he left the failing Data-soft to found Novalogic, Inc. 

Rather than rushing into the market like other would-be industry players (Quaker Oats, Mattel Electronics), Garcia formed a small team of people from the Dubai film enterprise and experienced Southern Californian programmers.

Creating an entertainment industry approach informed by his experience in the film industry, Garcia pioneered sustainable computer game business. Garcia's innovative approach moved away from the viewpoint of video games as "toys". While Mattel and others had viewed video games as a fad, Garcia's approach focused not only on game play, but on technology development and presentation as well. This ultimately led to a line of interactive entertainment software that consistently kept up with the demand for novelty.

1990s 

In 1999 Garcia, again realizing the versatility of his industry, reached out to Lockheed Martin, the American military technology company. By mapping out a partnership for Nova logic with Lockheed and other military services, Garcia again chartered new ground for the industry, paving the way for the subsequent boom in first-person military simulations.

Philanthropy 

Garcia has acquired multiple California estates that he uses to support charitable causes. He has joined up with Doctors Without Borders to raise money for their international efforts. The 2007 event was used as a model in the 2008–2009 Doctors Without Borders fund-raising manual.

Controversy 

Garcia's choice to rent one of his Malibu homes, traditionally used for charitable events, to commercial group Polaroid, came under scrutiny in 2007. Neighbors at his beach home complained that celebrities Lindsay Lohan and Paris Hilton were bringing an unwanted element to the community. The story was put on the cover of the LA Times but quickly died down once Polaroid's contract with Garcia expired.

References

External links 
 John A. Garcia at MobyGames

1949 births
Living people
American businesspeople
American people of Galician descent
American video game designers
DePaul University alumni
People from Galicia (Spain)
Spanish emigrants to the United States